Puskás Cup or Puskás-Suzuki Kupa is an international football tournament founded by the Ferenc Puskás Football Academy in Felcsút, Hungary and the Magyar Suzuki Corporation in 2008. The aim of the founders is to establish a club tournament which offers the opportunity for talented young footballers to measure themselves internationally at the U-17 age level and to establish a fitting memorial to Ferenc Puskás.

History

In 2008 four teams competed for the first ever Puskás Cup trophy which was finally won by La Fabrica, the youth team of Ferenc Puskás's former club Real Madrid C.F.

In 2009 six teams participated and the final match was broadcast in three different countries (the Czech Republic, Slovakia, and Romania) and the official Real Madrid TV aired a summary of the tournament.

In 2010 AC Milan were the first Italian club to be invited to participate in the Puskás-Suzuki Cup. The best goalkeeper of the tournament was Georgios Kollias (Panathinaikos), the best player was Spidron Furlanos (Panathinaikos), and the top goalscorer was Valér Kapacina (Budapest Honvéd).

The 2012 Puskás Cup was won by Budapest Honvéd by beating the hosts, Puskás Akadémia 7-0 in the final. Among the seven Honvéd goals, Gergely Bobál scored 4 goals.

The 2014 Puskás Cup was won by Real Madrid by beating Puskás Akadémia 1-0 in the final at the Pancho Arena. This match coincided with the inauguration ceremony of the new football stadium in Felcsút. György Szöllősi, communication director of the Ferenc Puskás Football Academy, announced that there will be 4,500 spectators at the final of the 2014 Puskás Cup. Among the invited guests there will be the wife of Ferenc Puskás, the former Croatian football legend, Davor Šuker, the former German international and Hungary coach, Lothar Matthäus, former Videoton coach and Portugal international Paulo Sousa, and former Golden Team members Jenő Buzánszky and Gyula Grosics. The opening speech will be delivered by the president of the  Hungarian Olympic Committee and former Hungarian MP Pál Schmitt and the president of the Spanish Football Federation, Ángel María Villar.

The 2015 Puskás Cup was won by Budapest Honvéd by beating three-time champions La Fábrica in the final on 6 April 2015 at the Pancho Arena in Felcsút. Hagi Academy finished third by beating Feyenoord Academy. The home side, Puskás Akadémia finished fifth by beating Panathinaikos 2-1.

Title-holders Budapest Honvéd won the 2016 Puskás Cup by beating the host club, Puskás Akadémia FC in the final in a penalty shoot-out. La Fabrica won the bronze medal by beating newcomers KRC Genk Jeugd in the third place play-off.

Results

Statistics

Teams reaching the top four

Participation

References

External links
 Official Website

 
International club association football competitions hosted by Hungary